The aircraft emergency frequency (also known as GUARD) is a frequency used on the aircraft band reserved for emergency communications for aircraft in distress. The frequencies are 121.5 MHz for civilian, also known as International Air Distress (IAD) or VHF Guard, and 243.0 MHz—the second harmonic of VHF guard—for military use, also known as Military Air Distress (MAD) or UHF Guard.  Earlier emergency locator transmitters (ELTs) used the guard frequencies to transmit, but an additional frequency of 406 MHz is used by a more modern emergency locator transmitter.

History
The choice of 121.5 MHz was made by ICAO in conjunction with ARINC and the ITU.

Monitoring

In the United States, the emergency frequency is monitored by most air traffic control towers, FSS services, national air traffic control centers, military air defense and other flight and emergency services, as well as by many commercial aircraft. The notice to airmen FDC 4/4386 requires "…all aircraft operating in United States National Airspace, if capable, shall maintain a listening watch on VHF GUARD 121.5 or UHF 243.0."

In the UK, 121.5 MHz is monitored by the Royal Air Force Distress and Diversion cells (known as "D&D") at the London Terminal Control Centre and the Shanwick Oceanic Control, from a nationwide network of antennas. Depending on the aircraft's altitude and location, the personnel in the centres may be able to use triangulation to determine its exact position which can be useful to the pilot if the aircraft is lost or "temporarily unsure of position".

Use

Both guard frequencies can be used by any aircraft in distress or experiencing an emergency and in addition it can be used by air traffic control to warn aircraft if they are about to fly into restricted or prohibited airspace.

Aircraft will also be contacted on 121.5 MHz when intercepted by air defence aircraft, to ask for identification and intentions and to pass on instructions.

Locating beacons

Older emergency locator transmitters transmit on 121.5 MHz in case of impact. Newer ELTs transmit on 406 MHz, with a low power beacon on 121.5 MHz for local homing. Satellites listen for the signals and alert local personnel to the emergency, and the beacon allows search and rescue to find the scene of the accident faster. Beacons operating at 406 MHz are encoded, allowing the vessel of origin to be determined and false alarms to be quickly verified. Satellite support for the 121.5 MHz–only versions was discontinued in early 2009.

See also 
 Air-ground radiotelephone service
 Airband
 Distress signal
 Mayday
 Transponder (aeronautics)

References

External links 

Air traffic control
Airbands
Emergency communication
International telecommunications
Rescue

ja:航空無線機#周波数および出力